A Long Way Home is a 1981 American made-for-television drama film directed by Robert Markowitz, written by Dennis Nemec, and starring Timothy Hutton, Brenda Vaccaro, and Rosanna Arquette. The film was nominated for two awards at the 40th Golden Globe Awards in 1982.

Plot
As children, Donald, David and Carolyn are abandoned by their parents and placed in foster care by the government. About a decade later, Donald becomes determined to find his missing siblings. He has no idea where they are. A female counselor at the foster care breaks the rule and assists Donald in finding his long separated brother and sister who are now full adults.

Cast
 Timothy Hutton as Donald Branch Booth 
 Brenda Vaccaro as Lillian Jacobs 
 Rosanna Arquette as Rose Cavanaugh 
 Paul Regina as David Branch Czaky 
 John Lehne as Riggins 
 George Dzundza as Floyd Booth 
 Bonnie Bartlett as JoAnn Booth 
 Wil Wheaton as Donald Branch (Child)
 Brendan Klinger as David Branch (Child)
 Neta Lee Noy as Carolyn (Child)
 Lauren Peterson as Carolyn (Adult)
 Floyd Levine as Judge Sosna

Reception

Reviews 
The film received reviews from sources including Tom Shales of The Washington Post, The Christian Science Monitor, and The New York Times.

Awards and nominations

See also
Saroo Brierley

References

External links

1981 television films
1981 films
1981 drama films
Films directed by Robert Markowitz
American drama television films
1980s English-language films
1980s American films